Pole balancing may refer to:
 Perch (equilibristic)
 Inverted pendulum